The 2016 season is the 121st year in the club's history, the 105th season in Clube de Regatas do Flamengo's football existence, and their 46th in the Brazilian Série A, having never been relegated from the top division.

This season Flamengo returned to the continental scenario after two years (last time playing in the 2014 Copa Libertadores) participating in the 2016 Copa Sudamericana, the last time Flamengo played in this competition was in 2011. The club also competed in the first edition of the Primeira Liga losing in the semi-finals to Atlético Paranaense. At Copa do Brasil the early elimination to Fortaleza in the second round gave the club a spot to play the Copa Sudamericana reaching the round of 16 being eliminated by Chilean club Palestino.

Kits
For the first time in the club's history the football team have four different uniform kits for the season. The traditionals striped home kit and white away kit, and two alternate kits.

Supplier: Adidas / Sponsor: Caixa / Back of the shirt: MRV / Lower back: YES! Idiomas / Shoulder: Universidade Brasil / Sleeves: iFood; Carabao / Numbers: TIM

Club

First-team staff
As of 18 July 2016.

Other information

First-team squad

Players with Dual Nationality
   Emerson
   Federico Mancuello

   Paulo Victor
   Lucas Mugni

Transfers

In

Out

Loan in

Loan out

Statistics

Appearances and goals
Last updated on 12 December 2016.
 Players in italic have left the club during the season.

|}

Top scorers
Includes all competitive matches

Disciplinary record

Overview

Pre-season and friendlies

Competitions

Rio State League (Campeonato Carioca)

Group stage

Matches

For their last match in the group stage, each team played a team from the other group.

Taça Guanabara

Matches

Final stage

Semifinal

Copa do Brasil

First stage

Second stage

Average attendances
Includes all home matches in the 2016 Copa do Brasil.

Série A

The fixtures for the 2016 season were announced on 25 April 2016. Flamengo began their league campaign with a 1–0 win at home against Sport Recife on 14 May 2016, with Éverton scoring the only goal of the match. This was also the only match in the league with coach Muricy Ramalho commanding the team, later in the same week the veteran head coach had heart problems–he was quickly hospitalized and resigned from the job weeks later. After few matches as interim, Zé Ricardo took charge as the new head coach.

League table

Results summary

Results by round

Average attendances
Includes all home matches in the 2016 Série A.

Matches
Goals and red cards are shown.

Primeira Liga

The 2016 Primeira Liga is the first edition of this competition. Featuring 12 of 14 founding members, Minas Gerais and Santa Catarina leagues provided three entrants, while Rio de Janeiro, Rio Grande do Sul and Paraná provide two each.

Group stage

Matches

Semifinal

Average attendances
Includes all matches in the 2016 Primeira Liga.

Copa Sudamericana

As 12th place in the 2015 Série A, and being one of the best teams eliminated before 2016 Copa do Brasil round of 16, Flamengo will enter the Copa Sudamericana in the second stage. The draw has been made on 12 July 2016 with the first stage taking place on 9 August 2016.

Second stage

Round of 16

Honors

Individuals

Club ranking
Flamengo position on the Club World Ranking during the 2016 season, according to clubworldranking.com.

References

External links
 Clube de Regatas do Flamengo
 Flamengo official website (in Portuguese)

Brazilian football clubs 2016 season
CR Flamengo seasons